Ronald Cheng Chung-kei (born 9 March 1972) is a Hong Kong singer and actor.

Life and career 
Ronald Cheng was born in Hong Kong. Originally intending to work behind the scenes as a songwriter and a producer, Cheng did odd jobs at his father (Director of EMI Asia)'s company EMI— which included doing backing vocalist for the likes of Alan Tam and Priscilla Chan — during summers as a youth. The lessons were apparently effective, as producers started taking notice of Cheng's voice and he was signed to a recording contract soon thereafter. Cheng first shot to popularity in Taiwan before returning home and enjoying some success in Hong Kong. However, his singing career went into a lull from 2000 to 2003 due to the infamous "air rage incident", when, on a flight from Los Angeles to Taipei, he became drunk and had an altercation with the flight attendant and co-pilot. However, Cheng's career rebounded later.

Cheng returned to the Cantopop market in 2003, however success for him did not arrive until 2005, where his signature song "無賴" (Rascal) was voted one of the Top 10 songs at various music award shows, notably TVB's Jade Solid Gold, where it was voted the most popular song of 2005.

Cheng won his first Best Supporting Actor award for his performance in Vulgaria at the 32nd Hong Kong Film Award.

Cheng's song 《MY ONLY ONE》was awarded one of the Top 10 golden songs organized by VivTV, 《Chill Club》, presented on 18 April 2021 

On 23 April 2021, Cheng held Hong Kong's first outdoor drive-in concert, entitled《Drive in Ultra – WEE are Ronald Cheng》. Many celebrities showed up to help out, including Josie Ho Chiu-yi, Ekin Cheng, Candy Lo and Kelly Chen etc.

Personal life 
His father, Norman Cheng (鄭東漢), is the chairperson and CEO of EMI, and formerly of the Asia Pacific division of PolyGram and then Universal Music.

Ronald Cheng started his relationship with Charlene Choi, a Hong Kong singer and actress, in 2004, after starring as lovers in the film Hidden Heroes. Their marriage was kept secret from the public, and they avoided going out together except for family gatherings. In 2010, while Choi announced ending the relationship with Cheng, the press revealed that they had registered their marriage in Los Angeles, United States in 2006. Both Cheng and Choi admitted to the marriage, but decided to divorce.
Later, he dated Sammie Yu Sze-man, then a hostess in Cable TV Hong Kong, and Yu gave birth to a daughter in July 2011. They married in the same year and later had a son in 2015.

Discography 
 1996
 左右為難 (In A Dilemma) – Mandarin Album
 別愛我 (Don't Love Me) – Mandarin Album
1997
 情深 (Deep Love) – Cantonese Album
 最愛的人不是你 (You Are Not My Dearest Lover) – Mandarin EP
 絕口不提！愛你 (Don't Say! Love You) – Mandarin Album
 戒情人 (Abstain From Love) – Mandarin Album
1998
 時間 人物 地點 (Time, People, Place) – Mandarin / Cantonese New + Best Selections
 敵人 (Enemy) – Mandarin Album
1999
 我真的可以 (I Really Can) – Mandarin Album
 One More Time – Cantonese Album
2000
 聲聲愛你 (Sounds Love You) – Mandarin New + Best Selections
 緣份無邊界 (Love Without Borderline) – Cantonese Compilation
 真朋友 (True Friend) – Mandarin Album
2002
 Encore – Mandarin New + Best Selections
2003
 唔該， 救救我 (Please Help!!!) – Cantonese Album
 唔該， 救救我 "火紅火熱"版 (Please Help!!! - 2 AVCD Version) – Cantonese Album
2005
 Before After – Cantonese Album
2006
 正宗K (Karaoke Cheng) – Cantonese / Mandarin New + Best Selections
 鄭中基演唱會二零零六 (Ronald Cheng Live in Concert 2006) – Cantonese / Mandarin Live Album
2008
 怪胎 (Freak) – Mandarin New + Best Selections

Filmography

Film

Television series

MV Appearance (Actor)

Awards and nominations

Film & TV

Music

References

External links 
 
 
 Ronald Cheng on Sina Twitter
 Ronald Cheng at the Hong Kong Cinemagic

1972 births
Living people
Hong Kong people of Taiwanese descent
20th-century Hong Kong male singers
20th-century Hong Kong male actors
21st-century Hong Kong male singers
21st-century Hong Kong male actors
Cantopop singers
Hong Kong Mandopop singers
Hong Kong male film actors
Hong Kong male comedians